The Museum of Army Transport was a museum of British Army vehicles in Beverley, East Riding of Yorkshire, England.

The collection included a diverse collection of armoured vehicles and support vehicles, many of which were part of the National Army Museum, as well as railway locomotives and rolling stock, and the only remaining Blackburn Beverley, aircraft XB259, which was the first production Beverley.

History 

The museum went into administration after it was faced with a £140,000 repair bill for its roof, closing on 22 August 2003. The collection has been split up, with most of it moved to the National Army Museum stores in 2005, though the Beverley is now at Fort Paull Museum, Armouries and Visitors Centre, and Kitchener's railway coach is now at the Royal Engineers Museum. Some of the collection was privately owned and so was returned.

The National Army Museum also took on the military steam railway locomotives in the MAT collection, briefly putting it into storage before loaning it to the Isle of Wight Steam Railway in 2005 and transferring it and another locomotive, WD198 "Royal Engineer", to the railway three years later. Another such locomotive was the small, 1893 locomotive "Gazelle", which had previously been on display at the Longmoor military railway and is now on loan to the Colonel Stephens Railway Museum, Tenterden. The National Army Museum now stores most of the MAT collection vehicles in Stevenage, though several are on loan to The Tank Museum at Bovington Camp, Dorset, and a few are on display in the National Army Museum's own galleries.

References

External links

Army museums in England
Beverley
Defunct museums in England
Museums in the East Riding of Yorkshire
Royal Logistic Corps